Keiron William Reardon (May 8, 1900 – February 4, 1978) was an American politician in the state of Washington. He served in the Washington State Senate from 1933 to 1941, from 1943 to 1944, and from 1945 to 1949. From 1939 to 1941, he was President pro tempore of the Senate.

References

Democratic Party Washington (state) state senators
1900 births
1978 deaths
20th-century American politicians